Truro Town Hall, formerly Union Hall, is the town hall of Truro, Massachusetts.  It is located on Town Hall Road, east of Massachusetts Route 6.  The two story wood-frame building was built in 1848 to serve as a meeting place for several fraternal organizations, including the International Order of Odd Fellows and the Sons of Temperance.  It served these organizations for only a few years, and was rented by the town for town meetings for a time before being purchased by the town.  The building exhibits Greek Revival features, including corner pilasters and a deep architrave.  The roof is topped by an octagonal cupola mounted on a square structure.

The building was listed on the National Register of Historic Places in 1997 as "Union Hall".

See also
National Register of Historic Places listings in Barnstable County, Massachusetts

References

1848 establishments in Massachusetts
Buildings and structures in Barnstable County, Massachusetts
City and town halls on the National Register of Historic Places in Massachusetts
Government buildings completed in 1848
Greek Revival architecture in Massachusetts
Greek Revival buildings
National Register of Historic Places in Barnstable County, Massachusetts
Town halls in Massachusetts
Truro, Massachusetts